"You Were Mine" is a song written and recorded in 1959 by Paul Giacalone and performed by American doo-wop group The Fireflies. 

"You Were Mine" was written by 19-year-old Giacalone about a girl he met while he was touring. It spent 16 weeks on the Billboard Hot 100, and peaked at #21 on October 26, 1959, while reaching #15 on Canada's CHUM Hit Parade.

Charts

References

1959 songs
1959 singles